The 2018 Rugby Europe Sevens Grand Prix Series serves as a qualifying tournament for the 2019 Hong Kong Sevens qualifier. The three top placing 2018-2019 non-core World Series teams — Ireland, Germany, and Russia — advance to the 2019 Hong Kong Sevens qualification tournament. Ireland won the series, winning three out of the four tournaments.

The non-hosting team with the fewest points — Sweden — is relegated to the 2019 Trophy tournament.

Schedule

Standings

⍻ Russia started this series as a World Series core team but lost its core status at the 2018 Paris Sevens on June 10, 2018. 

✓ indicates 2018-2019 World Series core nation

* Poland cannot be relegated due to being a host nation

Moscow

Pool Stage

Pool A

Pool B

Pool C

Knockout stage

Challenge Trophy

5th Place

Cup

Marcoussis

Pool Stage

Pool A

Pool B

Pool C

Knockout stage

Challenge Trophy

5th Place

Cup

Exeter

Pool Stage

Pool A

Pool B

Pool C

Knockout stage

Challenge Trophy

5th Place

Cup

Łódź

Pool Stage

Pool A

Pool B

Pool C

Knockout stage

Challenge Trophy

5th Place

Cup

References

External links
 Tournament page
 Rugby Europe Sevens

Grand Prix
2018
2018 rugby sevens competitions
2018 in European sport